Sir Stephen Cave  (28 December 1820 – 6 June 1880) was a British lawyer, writer and Conservative politician. He notably served as Paymaster-General between 1866 and 1868 and again between 1874 and 1880 and as Judge Advocate General between 1874 and 1875.

Background and education
Born at Clifton, Cave was the eldest son of Daniel Cave, of Cleve Hill, near Bristol (d. 9 March 1872), by his marriage on 15 April 1820 to Frances, only daughter of Henry Locock, MD, of London. The banker Sir Charles Cave, 1st Baronet, was his younger brother. He was educated at Harrow and Balliol College, Oxford, where he graduated BA in 1843 and MA in 1846.

Legal and political career
Being called to the bar at the Inner Temple on 20 November 1846, Cave started his career by going the western circuit. On 29 April 1859 he entered parliament as Conservative Member of Parliament for New Shoreham, and retained this seat until 24 March 1880. He was sworn of the Privy Council on 10 July 1866, and served as Vice-President of the Board of Trade under the Earl of Derby between 1866 and 1867, when the office was abolished, and as Paymaster-General under Derby and then Benjamin Disraeli from 1866 until the fall of the Conservative government in December 1868. In 1866 he was appointed chief commissioner for negotiating a fishery convention in Paris.

When the Conservatives returned to power under Disraeli in February 1874, Cave was appointed Judge Advocate General and Paymaster-General. He relinquished the former office in November 1875 but continued as Paymaster-General until 1880. In December 1875 he was sent on a special mission to Egypt by Benjamin Disraeli to report on the financial condition of that country together with John Stokes. He returned in March 1876. On 20 March 1880 he was appointed a Knight Grand Cross of the Order of the Bath (GCB).

Cave was also a Fellow of the Society of Antiquaries, of the Zoological Society, and of other learned societies, chairman of the West India Committee, a director of the Bank of England and of the London Dock Company and a Deputy Lieutenant and Justice of the Peace for Gloucestershire.

Family
Cave married Emma Jane, eldest daughter of the Reverend William Smyth of Elkington Hall, Lincolnshire, on 7 September 1852. They had no children. He died at Chambéry, Savoy, on 6 June 1880, aged 60. Lady Cave died in November 1905.

Publications
 A Few Words on the Encouragement given to Slavery and the Slave Trade by recent Measures, and chiefly by the Sugar Bill of 1846 (1849).
 Prevention and Reformation the Duty of the State or of Individuals? With some account of a Reformatory Institution (1856).
 On the distinctive Principles of Punishment and Reformation (1857).
 Papers relating to Free Labour and the Slave Trade (1861).

References

External links
The New York Times obituary, 8 June 1880.
Caricature of Sir Stephen Cave at darvillsrareprints.com

|-

1820 births
1880 deaths
Members of the Inner Temple
Alumni of Balliol College, Oxford
Conservative Party (UK) MPs for English constituencies
Deputy Lieutenants of Gloucestershire
Fellows of the Zoological Society of London
Knights Grand Cross of the Order of the Bath
Members of the Privy Council of the United Kingdom
Members of the Parliament of the United Kingdom for New Shoreham
UK MPs 1859–1865
UK MPs 1865–1868
UK MPs 1868–1874
UK MPs 1874–1880
United Kingdom Paymasters General
People educated at Harrow School